Robert McElroy may refer to:
Robert McElroy (Ontario politician) (c. 1810–1881), mayor of Hamilton, Ontario, Canada
Robert Herbert McElroy (1860–1920), Ontario merchant and political figure
Robert McNutt McElroy (1872–1959), American historian
Robert R. McElroy (1928–2012), American photographer
Robert W. McElroy (born 1954), American Catholic cardinal